The MGP-15 is a submachine gun designed for issue to special forces made by SIMA-CEFAR, updated with a longer barrel and other features. The name was changed from previous MGP models due to modifications, including a change to a barrel with a threaded muzzle, usually fitted with a screwed-on muzzle cap, that allows a suppressor to be quickly screwed on.

Design
Like all MGP submachine guns, the weapon can utilize Uzi submachine gun magazines.  A folding butt stock is provided, so arranged that with the butt folded along the right-hand side of the receiver the butt plate can act as a form of foregrip.

Variants
 MGP-84
 An upgraded version of the MGP-15. Used in close protection duties.

 MGP-14
 A semi-automatic version of the MGP-84, which has a folding forward grip. Also known as the MGP-14 Micro or as the MGP-14 Pistol. For a time, it was known as the MGP-84C.

References

Bibliography

See also
 MGP submachine gun

9mm Parabellum submachine guns
Machine pistols
Weapons of Peru